Weidenau is a suburban part (Stadtteil) of the city Siegen in Germany.

Weidenau, a northern part of Siegen, shares borders with Niedersetzen in the north, Geisweid in the north-west, the central part of Siegen in the south, Birlenbach in the west, Bürbach in the south-east and Dreis-Tiefenbach, a part of the city of Netphen in the north-east.

The University of Siegen is located in Weidenau.

History 
Weidenau, formerly belonging to the Amt Weidenau till 1966 and afterwards to the city of Hüttental is a part of Siegen since 1. January 1975.

Population 
At the end of 2010 Weidenau had a population of 15.064 inhabitants.

Development of Population:

References 

Siegen